Langley is a rural locality in the North Burnett Region, Queensland, Australia.

Geography 
The Burnett River bounds the locality to the south and east.

The Burnett Highway passes through the locality from north to south. Splinter Creek runs roughly parallel and east of the highway, both entering from Tellebang and existing to Abercorn.

The predominant land use is grazing on native vegetation with a small amount of irrigated crop growing near the creek and river.

Gin Gin–Mount Perry–Monto Road runs through from south-east to north.

History 
Langley Flat Provisional School opened in 1927, becoming Langley Flat State School in 1927. It closed temporarily on two occasions before finally closing in 1947. It was on the corner of the Burnett Highway and Cooks Road with Splinter Creek to the east.

Education 
There are no schools in Langley. The nearest primary school is Abercorn State School in neighbouring Abercorn to the south-west. The nearest secondary schools are Eidsvold State School in Eidsvold to the south and Monto State High School in Monto to the north.

Amenities 
There is a camping reserve on the Burnett Highway.

References 

North Burnett Region
Localities in Queensland